Eva Germaine Rimington Taylor (1879–1966) was an English geographer and historian of science, the first woman to hold an academic chair of geography in the United Kingdom.

Taylor was educated at the Camden School for Girls, the North London Collegiate School, and Royal Holloway College. In 1903 she obtained a first class BSc in chemistry from the University of London. While teaching chemistry she studied at the University of Oxford and from 1908 to 1910 acted as research assistant to A. J. Herbertson, head of the Oxford Geography School. She wrote school geography textbooks in collaboration with J. F. Unstead, and lectured at Clapham Training College for Teachers, the Froebel Institute, the East London College (later Queen Mary College), and Birkbeck College. Gaining a DSc in geography from the University of London in 1929, she was appointed professor of geography in 1930, and held the post until 1944.

Works

 Second Edition, 1971

References
G. R. Crone, 'Obituary: Professor E. G. R. Taylor, D. Sc.', The Geographical Journal 132:4 (1966), pp. 594–596

External links
Eila M. J. Campbell, ‘Taylor, Eva Germaine Rimington (1879–1966)’, rev. Elizabeth Baigent, Oxford Dictionary of National Biography, Oxford University Press, 2004, accessed 6 Dec 2007
Peter de Clercq, The Life andWork of E.G.R. Taylor (1879–1966), author of The Mathematical Practitioners of Tudor and Stuart England and The Mathematical Practitioners of Hanoverian England, The Journal of the Hakluyt Society, February 2007

1879 births
1966 deaths
Alumni of Royal Holloway, University of London
Alumni of the University of London
Academics of Birkbeck, University of London
Academics of Queen Mary University of London
British geographers
Historians of science
British historians of mathematics
People educated at Camden School for Girls
Women geographers
Victoria Medal recipients